Khaqan Abbasi was a Pakistani politician who served as Federal Minister for Production in Prime Minister Muhammad Khan Junejo's cabinet until 1988. He was the father of Shahid Khaqan Abbasi, former Prime Minister of Pakistan and Sadia Abbasi.

He was a decorated Air Force Veteran and retired as an Air Commodore in 1978. He then moved to Jordan and served as the advisor of the Royal Jordanian Air Force. With the support of then King of Jordan, he undertook construction projects in Saudi Arabia which turned him into a billionaire.

He was elected to the National Assembly of Pakistan from NA-36 Rawalpindi-I in 1985 Pakistani general election by defeating Raja Zafar ul Haq. He was inducted into the federal cabinet of Prime Minister Muhammad Khan Junejo due to close relationship with Zia-ul-Haq and was appointed as Minister for production but was later removed from the cabinet after Prime Minister Junejo and Zia-ul-Haq developed differences.

He died on April 10, 1988, after his car was hit by a missile in the Ojhri Camp disaster.

References

Khaqan
Pakistani MNAs 1985–1988
Punjabi people
Pakistan Air Force officers
Pakistani expatriates in Jordan
1988 deaths